The Calvary at Saint-Vennec near Briec in the arrondissement of Quimper in Brittany.

Background and description
As was the case with the Calvary at Landrévarzec, this calvary is also triangular in shape and concentrates in the main on depictions of the apostles and also has a "Notre-Dame de Pitié" at the base of the cross. On ledges on the shaft of the central cross are statues of the Virgin Mary, Mary Magdalene and John the Evangelist.  At the summit of the central cross, Jesus is shown on the cross with angels collecting his blood into chalices. Around the pedestal platform are statues of the apostles although some there originally have gone and some have no heads. St Peter can be recognised by the very large key which he holds. The calvary dates to 1556.

Gallery

Further reading
"Sculpteurs sur pierre en Basse-Bretagne. Les Ateliers du XVe au XVIIe Siècle" by Emmanuelle LeSeac'h. Published by Presses Universitaires de Rennes. .

See also
Calvary at Landrévarzec

References

Saint-Vennec
Buildings and structures in Finistère